Catherine "Cathy" Yap-Yang (born February 1, 1971) is a Filipina multi-awarded business journalist who has worked in various news outfits across the Asia-Pacific region over a span of 15 years. She is the head of the PLDT corporate communications group.

Background
She graduated with an AB Communication Arts degree from the De La Salle University in 1991. After graduation, Yap-Yang joined ABS-CBN and tenured for eight years (1992-2000) as reporter, researcher and pinch-hitter for the former Philippine Vice-president Noli de Castro on TV Patrol. She succeedingly became a business news presenter for several Sarimanok News Network (SNN, later called the ABS-CBN News Channel or ANC) shows, such as Stock Market Live, The World Tonight, and The Weekend News. She also co-hosted the show, Usapang Business in tandem with Ces Drilon on ABS-CBN.

In 2000, the Reuters Foundation sent Yang to the Oxford University to take a Masters in Journalism and in Cardiff University in the United Kingdom. Months later, she joined Bloomberg TV in Tokyo, and then moved afterward to Hong Kong.

Yang also joined Reuters Television as their news anchor from 2010 to 2013, and CCTV News as their reporter covering the whole of Hong Kong from 2013 to 2015. In 2015, Yang re-joined ABS-CBN as part of the on-air anchormen of the cable news channel ANC and beefed up their business news coverage. She served as the host of ANC's Market Edge and anchor of Business Nightly (replacing Warren de Guzman) in September 2015.

On August 6, 2020, Yang joined PLDT as First Vice President and Group Communications Officer. She will also oversee the communications needs of the MVP Group of Companies, which includes Smart Communications and TV5 Network.

Recognition
Asian TV Awards- Best TV News Presenter 2019
Asian Academy Awards- Best TV News Anchor 2019
Asian Television Awards - Best TV Newscaster (2001, 2002, 2003)
Fleetstreet Award by the British Council
Excellence in Media Award - De La Salle University

References

Filipino television news anchors
1971 births
Hiligaynon people
Living people
Filipino business and financial journalists
ABS-CBN News and Current Affairs people
Reuters people
Bloomberg L.P. people
De La Salle University alumni
Filipino people of Chinese descent
PLDT people